Pt. Ubraj Narine (born 12 October 1991) is a Guyanese politician, paralegal and Hindu priest who is the Mayor of Georgetown, Guyana. He was elected in the November 2018 local government elections to represent Constituency 1 in the City Council and was subsequently elected as Mayor by the city council and re-elected in 2019 and 2020.

Reference 

Guyanese politicians
1991 births
Living people

People's National Congress (Guyana) politicians

Mayors of places in Guyana